Todo mal is a Mexican film written and directed by Issa López, and starring Osvaldo Benavides, Marcela Guirado, Martin Altomaro, Alfonso Dosal, and Sebastián Zurita. The film premiered on March 16, 2018 in Mexico.

Plot 
The film follows Fernando (Osvaldo Benavides), a young diplomat who has just achieved the most important achievement of his career: returning Montezuma's plume to Mexico. Fernando is also about to marry the love of his life. On the other hand, his two cousins, Matías (Alfonso Dosal) — a former pop star — and Dante (Martin Altomaro), a man trying to finish an infinite thesis that lives in the closet of his mother's house, are the complete opposite of our protagonist. Everything changes when Viviana (Marcela Guirado), Fernando's girlfriend, confesses through Whatsapp that she has cheated on him, a message that arrives at the least opportune moment. Fernando loses the control he has maintained all his life, stealing the plume and throwing himself in an insane mission for revenge, which could cost him his life, his poor cousins, and the chance to bring back the plume of Montezuma to a country that has been waiting 500 years for its return.

Cast 
 Osvaldo Benavides as Fernando
 Marcela Guirado as Viviana
 Martin Altomaro as Dante
 Alfonso Dosal as Matías
 Sebastián Zurita as Masiosare
 Marianna Burelli as Duva
 Paula Serrano as Carmen
 Harrison Jones as Austrian Diplomat

References

External links 
 

Mexican comedy films
2018 comedy films
2010s Mexican films
2010s Spanish-language films